State Road 802 (SR 802) is a major east–west highway serving central Palm Beach County, Florida spanning . The western terminus of SR 802 is an intersection with U.S. Route 441 (US 441) and SR 7 near Wellington; the eastern terminus is an intersection with Ocean Boulevard (SR A1A) in Lake Worth Beach. State Road 802 is a major commuter highway that is also a primary access road for the beaches of Palm Beach County. The majority of SR 802 is known locally as Lake Worth Road.

Route description

SR 802 begins at the intersection between US 441–SR 7 just southeast of Wellington, with SR 802 taking Lake Worth Road east, with the road being lined with golf courses and other residential housing from the western terminus east to the interchange with Florida's Turnpike.  Following the interchange, SR 802 becomes more commercial as it enters Greenacres. Lake Worth Road jogs slightly to the north just prior to the intersection with Jog Road, and continues through a mix of commercial and residential areas continuing eastward. At the intersection with SR 809 (Military Trail), it leaves Greenacres and enters Palm Springs, with SR 802 still heading east. Starting with the intersection with SR 807, it forms the northern border for the campus of Palm Beach Community College for several blocks, followed by the northern border of John Prince Memorial Park, then returning to a residential area as it heads for the overpass of Interstate 95 (I-95 or SR 9).

After crossing under I-95 without an interchange and passing Lake Worth Community High School, the road becomes a two way pair with Lake Avenue going eastbound and Lucerne Avenue going westbound, separated by a block. The roads pass through residential areas, as well as the site of a proposed Tri-Rail station, before hitting downtown Lake Worth Beach, crossing US 1, followed by SR 5. After a few more blocks, the roads become one again, crossing the Intracoastal Waterway, ending on the barrier island at SR A1A, less than a block away from the ocean.

West of US 441–SR 7, Lake Worth Road continues another  to its terminus, an intersection with South Shore Drive in Wellington.

History
State Road 802 was formed in 1945 in its current route.  Prior to the 1945 renumbering, it was State Road 174 and State Road 201.

Major intersections

References

External links 

802
802